Jackson Township is one of the thirteen townships of Wyandot County, Ohio, United States.  The 2010 census found 561 people in the township.

Geography
Located in the southwestern corner of the county, it borders the following townships:
 Richland Township - north
 Salem Township - northeast corner
 Mifflin Township - east
 Marseilles Township - southeast
 Goshen Township, Hardin County - southwest
 Jackson Township, Hardin County - west

Part of the village of Kirby is located in northeastern Jackson Township.

Name and history
It is one of thirty-seven Jackson Townships statewide.

Government
The township is governed by a three-member board of trustees, who are elected in November of odd-numbered years to a four-year term beginning on the following January 1. Two are elected in the year after the presidential election and one is elected in the year before it. There is also an elected township fiscal officer, who serves a four-year term beginning on April 1 of the year after the election, which is held in November of the year before the presidential election. Vacancies in the fiscal officership or on the board of trustees are filled by the remaining trustees.

References

External links
 County website

Townships in Wyandot County, Ohio
Townships in Ohio